is a private university in Higashi-ku, Okayama, Japan, established in 2007.

External links
  Official website 
 Official website 

Educational institutions established in 2007
Private universities and colleges in Japan
Okayama
Universities and colleges in Okayama Prefecture
2007 establishments in Japan